Venkata I (Venkata Raya or Venkatadri Raya) (1542 CE) was a ruler of a Vijayanagara Empire of South India. He was son of Achyuta Deva Raya, whom he succeeded in 1542.

Life
Achyuta Deva Raya was succeeded by his son Venkata I and  his maternal uncle Salakaraju Chinna Tirumala (Salakaraju Chinna Timmalayyadéva or Salakaraja Chinna Tirumalayyadeva) became regent. The latter, Salakaraju killed all the claimants to the throne including Venkata I and assumed full royal powers. Only Sadasiva Raya (son of Ranga Raya), who had hidden himself in the fort of Gutti, escaped.
 
As soon as Salakaraju heard about the plans of Aliya Rama Raya and his brothers (Tirumala Deva Raya and Venkatadri Raya) to dethrone him, he invited Ibrahim Adil Shah I and placed him on the throne of Vijayanagar for seven days. This was too much for the nobles of Vijayanagar to tolerate.
 
But they acted cleverly, offered full support to Salakaraju and requested him to send away  Ibrahim Adil Shah which he did after paying him a suitable compensation.
 
In 1543, Rama Raya and his supporters now marched into Vijayanagar, killed Salakaraju and placed Sadasiva Raya on the throne.

References
 Prof K.A. Nilakanta Sastry, History of South India, From Prehistoric times to fall of Vijayanagar, 1955, OUP, New Delhi (Reprinted 2002)

16th-century Indian monarchs
1542 deaths
People of the Vijayanagara Empire
Tulu people
Indian Hindus
Hindu monarchs
1542 in India
Year of birth unknown